Hairbangers Ball is an American 80's glam metal tribute band. They were formed in 2001 and have become a popular cover band in the Midwest. They have been booked at numerous city fests,  by Major League Baseball Teams,<ref name="White Sox Events" at private events and clubs.

Performances
The band mirrors the attire of iconic glam metal bands such as Guns and Roses, Mötley Crüe and Poison. Performers wear wigs and heavy eyeliner to mimic the look of these bands. The lead and backup singers frequently interact with the crowd and encourage their participation. According to their website the goal is to deliver a true representation of being at a rock concert in the 1980s. This appeals to Gen X-ers who want to relive their glory days as well as younger audiences who never got to experience it themselves. Hairbangers focuses on perfecting each song in their repertoire to make the experience as similar as possible to watching the original performers.,

References

External links
 

American glam metal musical groups
Tribute bands